The following tables compare general and technical information for a number of available bootloaders.

General information

Technical information
Note: The column MBR (Master Boot Record) refers to whether or not the boot loader can be stored in the first sector of a mass storage device. The column VBR (Volume Boot Record) refers to the ability of the boot loader to be stored in the first sector of any partition on a mass storage device.

Storage medium support

Operating system support

File-system support

Non-journaled

Journaled

Read-only

Other features

Notes 

BOOT Loaders